Kepler-37, also known as UGA-1785, is a G-type main-sequence star located in the constellation Lyra 209 light years from Earth. It is host to exoplanets Kepler-37b, Kepler-37c, Kepler-37d and Kepler-37e, all of which orbit very close to it. Kepler-37 has a mass about 80.3 percent of the Sun's and a radius about 77 percent as large. It has a temperature similar to that of the Sun, but a bit cooler at 5,417 K. It has about half the metallicity of the Sun.  With an age of roughly 6 billion years, it is slightly older than the Sun, but is still a main-sequence star.  Until January 2015, Kepler-37 was the smallest star to be measured via asteroseismology.

Planetary system

Kepler-37b is the closest planet to the Kepler-37. At the time of its discovery in February 2013, it was the smallest known exoplanet. At  in diameter, it is slightly larger than the Moon. It orbits Kepler-37 once every 13 days at a distance of about 0.1 astronomical units (AU). Kepler-37b has a rocky surface and is believed to be too small and too close to its star to support water or maintain an atmosphere.

Kepler-37c is around three-quarters of the diameter of Earth and orbits approximately every 21 days at a distance of just under 0.14 AU.  Kepler-37d is about twice the diameter of Earth. It orbits in around 40 days at a distance of nearly 0.21 AU.  Neither are able to support water due to their proximity to Kepler-37.

The periods of the three inner planets are close (within one per cent) to a 5:8:15 mean-motion resonance relationship.

Discovery
The Kepler planets were discovered in September 2012 with the aid of transit events detected by the Kepler space telescope, and announced to the public in February 2013.  Computer simulation was used to rule out other astronomical phenomenon mimicking planetary transit with probabilities of error <0.05% (3σ) for each potential planet.  Additionally, simulation demonstrated that the proposed planetary configuration was stable.  The exoplanets were considerably smaller than any previously detected, leading Science World Reports to state that "a major technological improvement for the telescope" had been achieved.

Thomas Barclay, an astrophysicist on the Kepler space telescope team, said the discovery was "really good news" in the search for hospitable planets, a prime objective of the project, because it demonstrated the telescope was capable of detecting Earth-sized planets.  However, he does not anticipate finding many planets as small as Kepler-37b due to the very small amount of light such planets obscure.  According to NASA scientist Jack Lissauer, the discovery of Kepler-37b "suggests such little planets are common, and more planetary wonders await as we continue to gather and analyze additional data."  Astronomer John Johnson of Caltech university said the discovery would have been "unimaginable" a few years ago and that the telescope had revolutionized astronomers' picture of the universe.

The asteroseismology work was, in part, paid for by White Dwarf Research Corporation, a crowd funded non-profit organization.

In 2014, a fourth planet with orbital period of 51 days was confirmed through transit timing variations. Previously this signal was thought to be a false positive, and was claimed again to be a false positive in 2021.

Notes

References

Further reading
 (Supplementary information)

External links

 Table of confirmed planets at NASA, Kepler mission

 
Planetary systems with three confirmed planets
Planetary transit variables
Lyra (constellation)
G-type main-sequence stars
0245
BD+44 3020
J18561431+4431052